Isturgia limbaria, the frosted yellow, is a moth of the family Geometridae.

Distribution
This species can be found in parts of Central and Southern Europe. It is extinct in Britain.

Habitat
These moths inhabit heathers, edge of the forests and scrubby areas.

Description

The male has feathered antennae, while those of the females are filiform. The upperside of the wings is yellow or orange yellow with a chocolate brown margin, less evident in the females. The underside of the hindwings is pale yellowish or greyish and strongly mottled, with visible longitudinal white stripes.

Biology
These day-flying moths fly from mid April to mid August  in one or two generation. The larvae feed on broom. They over-winter as a pupa.

The flight season refers to The Netherlands and Belgium. This may vary in other parts of the range.

References

External links

Paolo Mazzei, Daniel Morel, Raniero Panfili Moths and Butterflies of Europe and North Africa
Lepiforum.de
Vlindernet.nl 

Macariini
Moths of Europe
Taxa named by Johan Christian Fabricius
Articles containing video clips
Moths described in 1775